Samuel Clark or Clarke may refer to:

Clark
Samuel Clark (minister) (1727–1769), English minister
Samuel Clark (New York and Michigan politician) (1800–1870), American politician from New York and Michigan
Samuel Reed Clark (born 1826), American politician from Wisconsin
Samuel M. Clark (1842–1900), American politician from Iowa
Samuel Clark (rugby union) (1857–1947), Welsh international rugby player
Samuel Findlay Clark (1909–1998), Canadian soldier
Samuel Delbert Clark (1910–2003), Canadian sociologist
Sam Clark (born 1987), Australian actor and singer-songwriter

Clarke

Samuel Clarke (minister) (1599–1683), English clergyman and Puritan biographer
Samuel Clarke (annotator) (1626–1701), English Nonconformist clergyman known as an assiduous annotator of the Bible
Samuel Clarke (1675–1729), English philosopher and Anglican clergyman
Samuel Clarke of St Albans (1684–1750), English Nonconformist pastor and theological writer
 Samuel Asahel Clarke (1827–1909), Oregon poet, journalist, and historian.
Samuel Clarke (Canadian politician) (1853–?), Canadian merchant and politician
Sam Clarke (motorcyclist) (born 1996), Australian motorcycle racer
Sir Samuel Clarke, 1st Baronet (died 1719) of the Clarke baronets